Windward and leeward are terms used to describe direction relative to the wind.  Windward is upwind from the point of reference, i.e. towards the direction from which the wind is coming; leeward is downwind from the point of reference, i.e. along the direction towards which the wind is going.

The side of a ship that is towards the leeward is its "lee side".  If the vessel is heeling under the pressure of crosswind, the lee side will be the "lower side".  During the Age of Sail, the term weather was used as a synonym for windward in some contexts, as in the weather gage. 

Because it captures rain, the windward side of a mountain tends to be wet compared to the leeward it blocks.

Origin 

The term "lee" comes from the middle-low German word // meaning "where the sea is not exposed to the wind" or "mild". The terms Luv and Lee (engl. Windward and Leeward) have been in use since the 17th century.

Usage

Windward and leeward directions (and the points of sail they create) are important factors to consider in such wind-powered or wind-impacted activities as sailing, wind-surfing, gliding, hang-gliding, and parachuting. Other terms with broadly the same meaning are widely used, particularly upwind and downwind.

Nautical
Among sailing craft, the windward vessel is normally the more maneuverable. For this reason, rule 12 of the International Regulations for Preventing Collisions at Sea, applying to sailing vessels, stipulates that where two are sailing in similar directions in relation to the wind, the windward vessel gives way to the leeward vessel.

Naval warfare
In naval warfare during the Age of sail, a vessel always sought to use the wind to its advantage, maneuvering if possible to attack from windward.  This was particularly important for less maneuverable  square-rigged warships, which had limited ability to sail upwind, and sought to "hold the weather gage" entering battle.

This was particularly important once artillery was introduced to naval warfare. Ships heel away from the wind, so the leeward vessel would expose more of her topsides to shot, in extreme cases even part of her bottom.

Describing islands
The terms windward and leeward are used in reference both to sides (and climates) of individual islands and relative island locations in an archipelago. The windward side of an island is subject to the prevailing wind, and is thus the wetter (see orographic precipitation). The leeward side is the side distant from or physically in the lee of the prevailing wind, and typically the drier. 

In an archipelago windward islands are upwind and leeward islands are downwind of the prevailing winds, such as the trade winds of the Atlantic and Pacific oceans.

See also

 Barlavento (Windward) and Sotavento (Leeward) in Cape Verde Islands
 Downstream and upstream
 Foehn wind
 Lee shore
 List of nautical terms
 Northwestern Hawaiian Islands, also known as Leeward Islands
 Windward Islands, Leeward Islands and Leeward Antilles (in the Lesser Antilles)
 Windward Islands and Leeward Islands (in the Society Islands)

References

Nautical terminology
Orientation (geometry)
Wind